The R164 road is a regional road in Ireland, linking Kingscourt in County Cavan to the N51 near Athboy, County Meath.

Route
North to South the route starts in Kingscourt, County Cavan and in 2 km crosses into County Meath. It continues southwards through Moynalty, across the Kells Blackwater river and into Kells. 

In Kells it joins the R147 at Carrick Street and continues through Castle Street; turns into the N52 at Cross Street; continues through Farrell Street and Bective Street before leaving the N52 and heading south along Rockfield Street.

It leaves Kells south through Scurlockstown and Fordstown before terminating at the N51 3 km east of Athboy.

See also
Roads in Ireland
National primary road
National secondary road

References
Roads Act 1993 (Classification of Regional Roads) Order 2006 – Department of Transport

Regional roads in the Republic of Ireland
Roads in County Meath
Roads in County Cavan